Anthurium clarinervium, known as the velvet cardboard anthurium, is a species of flowering plant is in the family Araceae, native to Chiapas, Mexico. The Anthurium genus is known to contain approximately 1,000 species, resulting in one of the most diverse Central American tropical plant genera.

Description 
A. clarinervium is a deep forest green colored plant with a velvety leaf surface, containing reticulate venation which is an uncommon venation pattern for a monocot. The veins vary between ivory or light green in color and are usually 1 cm in width.  It has ovate, deeply-lobed leaves, resembling a human heart, with whitish veins, atop stems that are 1–2 cm thick. It grows naturally as an epiphyte. A. clarinervium produces orange berries containing numerous seeds and reproduces via sexual reproduction. This species has been unofficially placed in the category of Esqueleto herbs. The name Esqueleto is a Spanish term meaning skeleton, which describes the pattern of veins coursing throughout the leaves and resembles a ribcage. It may be confused with Anthurium crystallinum due to their similar appearance.

Distribution 

Anthurium clarinervium tends to grow in wet disturbed forests or elevated cloudy environments.  It is found naturally in Mexico. Anthurium clarinervium is an aroid perennial that flourishes in shaded regions of Mexico’s limestone ledges.

History 
A. clarinervium was first discovered in the 1950s in a small region of southern Mexico, growing at an elevation of 2500-3800 ft. It was found in a karstic rainforest region in soil containing limestone. This type of Anthurium is found thriving off other plant's nutrients through water absorption from other plants.A. clarinervium also absorbs different nutrients from leaves and debris from the rain.

Cultivars 
Although it grows naturally in tropical climates, many people find it to have attractive qualities, resulting in a high demand as a house plant. This plant exists in both a horticultural environment and in a tropical, natural environment. People enjoy the look of this species because it can bloom for several months and because of its unique foliage. Anthuriums can be challenging as houseplants because it is not easy to match the conditions of their natural environment in houses. But because an Anthurium is an epiphyte, they can survive many different habitats that are not similar to their normal humid rainforest environment.

Toxicity 
Anthurium clarinervium is poisonous to both humans and common pets upon ingestion. Toxic harm results from the presence of calcium oxalate crystals in the leaves which can cause improper mineral absorption and inflammation of the lining of the digestive tract. Ingesting this plant can cause drooling, nausea, trouble swallowing or breathing, diarrhea, and pain in the mouth and throat. Remedies include removing all parts of the plant, and rinsing our mouth with either milk or water. The calcium in the crystals and milk will bind together and reduce pain.

Diseases 
The genus Anthurium is susceptible to multiple types of bacterial and fungal diseases.

Bacterial diseases 

Bacterial blight (Xanthomonas axonopodis pv. dieffenbachiae)- Forms easily visible water-logged lesions along the leaf. Leaves also begin to yellow and necrosis occurs. Bacteria enters via pores or wounds such as rips, tears, or punctures. 
Bacterial wilt (Ralstonia solanacearum)- Typical wilting symptoms are observable with this disease. Plant exhibits leaf yellowing and stem browning. Vascular system allows swift spread of disease. Ooze or slime may leak out of wound of infected plant.

Fungal diseases 

Rhizoctonia root rot (Rhizoctonia solani)- Stems, typically young ones, become water-logged and droop due to the increased weight. The root system also becomes under attack if plant is infected.
Phytophthora/Pythium (Phytophthora nicotianae var. parasitica and Pythium splendens)- Both fungi are considered oomycetes, otherwise known as water molds. The root system of the plant is the main focus for either fungus. Wilting, chlorosis, and root dieback are all common symptoms related to these fungi. 
Black nose disease (Colletotrichum gloeosporioides)- As the name suggests, the floral spadix forms black spots. These spots rapidly grow and may result in spadix death.

Cultivation 

Bright, indirect sunlight is required for this plant. It prefers temperatures ranging from low  to low , and the humidity should be maintained at approximately 50% or higher, with an optimal range of 75-85%. These plants do not do well in small amounts of light or no light at all. Veins can lose saturation when little or no light is present. The plant also does not do well in direct sunlight. The plants may burn under intense heat and the leaves will turn a lighter green or pale yellow and/or wilt. The addition of modest fertilization will also provide the necessities for this plant to flourish. Aerated and loose soil is desired with levels of moisture remaining on the mild side.  A. clarinervium will struggle to grow in thick clay soil, with the possibility of root rot. Soil with a pH between 5.5 and 6.8 is ideal for this plant.

References

Sources
Aroid.org description

clarinervium
House plants
Endemic flora of Mexico
Flora of Chiapas